Decelia is a genus of moths of the family Crambidae. It contains only one species, Decelia terrosalis, which is found on Sulawesi.

References

Pyraustinae